Devapandalam is a panchayat village (PIN Code:606402) in Sankarapuram taluk in Kallakurichi district in the Indian state of Tamil Nadu. Located on Kallakurichi - Tiruvannamalai State High Way.
Tirukovilur is just 15 km away.
Devapandalam was a settlement of tamil shaiva mutt followers and hosts the school of Tamil hymns and Mutt administration.

Villages in Kallakurichi district